Nadine Ramkisson is a Trinidadian-born television host.

Ramkisson worked in MuchMusic (Canada), on the show Electric Circus, starting out as a dancer and eventually becoming the show's  host from 2000 to 2002. During this time, she interviewed many of show business' hottest stars, such as Wyclef Jean, Destiny's Child, Shaggy, Usher, Denzel Washington and many more actors, singers and athletes, often receiving very positive feedback from them.

Ramkisson is fluent in French and Spanish and sometimes uses these languages for her interviews.  She has also appeared in several movies, such as Exotica (1994) and Soul Survivor (1995).

References 

Much (TV channel) personalities
Living people
Year of birth missing (living people)
Trinidad and Tobago emigrants to Canada
Canadian VJs (media personalities)
Canadian women television personalities